This is a list of Asterix games of all varieties (book, board and video). The series sold more than 5 million units by 2003.

Gamebooks
Asterix Adventure Games — a series of game books in the style of the Choose Your Own Adventure books but with some randomization by way of dice and included props. Written by Stephen Thraves.
 Asterix to the Rescue (1986) — rescue the captured druid from Rome.
 Operation Britain (1987) — get mistletoe from Britain for the potion.
 Asterix Against All Odds (1992) — circumnavigate occupied Gaul (based on Asterix and the Banquet).
Alea jacta est! — a roleplaying system including attributes and combat. The reader plays the part of Justforkix from Asterix and the Normans in a series of scenarios moderated by the game books. Translated by Anthea Bell and Derek Hockridge.
 Le rendez-vous du chef (1988) — English: The Meeting of the Chieftains (1989)
 La vedette armoricaine (1988) — English: The Idol of the Gauls (1990)
 L'affaire des faux menhirs (1988) — English: The Roman Conspiracy (1991)
 Le grand jeu (1988) — English: The Great Game (not translated)
Find Asterix (1998) — a Where's Wally? clone with Asterix as the object of the search in crowded scenes from the world of 50 BC.

Board games

In 2006, licensed versions of numerous board games were produced, including Monopoly, Cluedo, Draughts, Ludo, Game of the Goose, Trivial Pursuit, Backgammon, Pay Day, Snakes and ladders, Quarto, and others.

Video games

Europe and Australia PAL
There were releases made as European or Australian PAL.

Most of the games were only released in PAL format for Europe and also Australia, because of the comic's acceptance in that region, opposed to the lower popularity in other regions.

Other regions

References

External links
Asterix.com lists of board games, card games, and video games
Asterix Adventure Games (Demian's Gamebook Web Page)
Alea jacta est! (Demian's Gamebook Web Page)
Gusworld: Finding Asterix
Board Game Geek
Asterix and Obelix games on MobyGames.

 
Asterix